Catatan Si Boy: The Series is a television series serving as a remake of the 1987's film of the same name. The series premiered on September 10, 2016 on NET.

Characters

Main 
 Boy (played by Achmad Megantara) - The main protagonist of the show.
 Ina (played by Marsha Aruan) - Boy's younger sister.
 Andi/Kendi (played by Zidni Hakim) - Boy's childhood friend.
 Emon (played by Kresna Julio) - Boy & Ina's best friend.
 Nuke (played by Hana Prinantina) - Boy's love interest.

Recurring 
 Pak Sahid (played by Leroy Osmani) - Boy & Ina's father.
 Bu Sahid (played by Lydia Kandou) - Boy & Ina's mother.
 Vera (played by Melayu Nicole)
 Shasha (played by Westny Dj)
 Ocha (played by Putri Anne)
 Ambar (played by Yova Gracia)

Episode

Season 1 
 Pilot

2016 Indonesian television series debuts